Paula Ramírez Ibáñez (born 23 April 1996) is a Spanish synchronised swimmer.

She won a bronze medal in the free routine combination competition at the 2018 European Aquatics Championships.

Notes

References

External links
 
 
 
 

1996 births
Living people
Spanish synchronized swimmers
World Aquatics Championships medalists in synchronised swimming
Artistic swimmers at the 2019 World Aquatics Championships
European Aquatics Championships medalists in synchronised swimming
Synchronized swimmers at the 2020 Summer Olympics
Olympic synchronized swimmers of Spain